Musician is cartridge number 31 in the official Magnavox/Philips line of games for the Philips Videopac. It came in a cardboard box roughly double the size of a standard Videopac game box, containing a keyboard overlay in the style of a piano keyboard; the cartridge, in a standard Videopac box with a single sheet where the manual would usually be; and a landscape format manual, over double the size of a standard game manual.

The purpose of the set is to turn the user's Videopac into a musical keyboard. It supports recording and editing sequences of up to 81 notes, although there is no way to save apart from writing a composition down on music manuscript. In the manual there are the following pieces of sheet music:

 "Badinerie" (Bach)
 "Brother Jacob"
 "The Entertainer"
 "Eurovision Tune"
 "Happy Birthday to You"
 "Liebestraum" (Liszt)
 "Lightly Row"
 "Merrily We Roll Along"
 "Michael Row the Boat Ashore"
 "Mosocow Night"
 "Old McDonald Had a Farm"
 "This Old Man"
 "Three Young Drummers"
 "Twinkle Twinkle Little Star"

External links
 Musician at videopac.org

1980 video games
Magnavox Odyssey 2 games
Music video games
Video games developed in the United States